The Gaiety Theater was a stand-alone art deco cinema house located at M.H. del Pilar Street in the Ermita district of the city of Manila. It was designed by Juan Nakpil, National Artist of the Philippines for Architecture, in 1935. The construction of these early theaters in the City of Manila provided the venue for early forms of entertainment like bodily , a local adaptation of vaudeville, with most eventually converting to movie theaters with the growth and popularity of Philippine cinema in the metropolis.

History
The Gaiety Theater was first owned by Harry Brown, the American producer of La vida de Jose Rizal, the first feature film produced in the Philippines. It was known for showing art films patronized by expats and old Spanish families. During the Second World War, its operation was stopped until Karl Nathan obtained permission from the Japanese authorities to reopen it, which at the time was owned by a prominent Filipino family with whom Nathan had struck an agreement, provided he could get the Japanese permit. Tickets to this theater during the Japanese occupation were cheap as compared to other movie houses in downtown Manila. The theater was also used as a place of worship by the Jesus is Lord Cosmopolitan Church.

Present
Until it was demolished in 2016 several families acting as caretakers of the old cinema were living inside. According to them, there were efforts to resurrect the Gaiety Theater in the 1990s but it failed. As of 2014, the theater was closed and the building remained in a dilapidated state. The roof of the building collapsed years ago leaving the cinema house open to all weather elements contributing to its fast deterioration.

References

External links

Theaters in Manila
Buildings and structures in Ermita
Buildings and structures completed in 1935
Works of National Artists of the Philippines
Art Deco architecture in the Philippines
Juan Nakpil buildings
Former cinemas
Theatres completed in 1935
Demolished buildings and structures in the Philippines
Buildings and structures demolished in 2016